Ghanaur is a town and a Nagar Panchayat in Patiala district in the state of Punjab, India and it is Sub-Tehsil of Rajpura with powers of Joint Magistrate.

Geography
It has an average elevation of 255 metres (836 feet). 

The Battle of Ghanaur happened here.

Demographics
 India census, Ghanaur had a population of 5754. Males constitute 53% of the population and females 47%. Ghanaur has an average literacy rate of 64%, higher than the national average of 59.5%: male literacy is 68%, and female literacy is 60%. In Ghanaur, 12% of the population is under 6 years of age. The Ghagar river flows near ghanaur. Narvana branch canal also touches the North side of town.

References

Cities and towns in Patiala district